= 1923–24 Atromitos F.C. season =

Atromitos
1923–24 season
- Chairman: Andreas Tsouroutsoylou
Home colours	Away colours

The 1923–24 season of Atromitos was the 1st in the club's history, thus they did not participate in a league, but they played a friendly game.

The chairman of the team was Andreas Tsouroutsoylou, the person that created the club.

== Friendly Game ==
1923–24 Friendly	Lenorman (Attikos Kolonos)	1–0	Atromitos	Athens
